The Rural Municipality of Torch River No. 488 is a rural municipality (RM) in the Canadian province of Saskatchewan within Census Division No. 14 and  Division No. 4. Located in the northeast-central portion of the province, it is north of the Town of Nipawin.

History 
The RM of Torch River No. 488 incorporated as a rural municipality on January 1, 1950.

Geography

Communities and localities 
The following urban municipalities are surrounded by the RM.

Towns
Choiceland

Villages
Love
Smeaton
White Fox

The following unincorporated communities are within the RM.

Organized hamlets
Garrick
Snowden

Localities
Carroll Cove
Cherry Ridge
Claytonville
Pruden's Point
Shipman
Torch River

Demographics 

Government 
The RM of Torch River No. 488 is governed by an elected municipal council and an appointed administrator that meets on the second Friday of every month. The reeve of the RM is Jerry Kindrat while its administrator is David Yorke. The RM's office is located in White Fox.

Transportation 
Highway 35—serves White Fox
Highway 55—serves White Fox, Garrick, Choiceland, Smeaton and Shipman
Highway 6—serves Choiceland
Highway 691—serves Snowden
Highway 106—serves Smeaton
Highway 790 --

See also 
List of rural municipalities in Saskatchewan

References 

Torch River
Torch River No. 488, Saskatchewan